Richard Queck (4 November 1888 – 20 December 1968) was a German footballer who played for Eintracht Braunschweig from 1907 to 1914. Richard Queck and his younger brother Rudolf Queck helped their club win the Northern German Championship in 1908 and 1913. Playing as left midfielder or winger he was known for his dribbling and goal scoring skills. He was the third player from Eintracht Braunschweig to be called to the German national team.

International career

Queck was also capped three times for the German national team – in 1909, 1910, and 1914, scoring two goals.

International goals
Scores and results table. Germany's goal tally first:

References

External links 
 

1888 births
1968 deaths
German footballers
Germany international footballers
Association football forwards
Eintracht Braunschweig players